William H. Miller III (born 1950) is an American investor, fund manager, and philanthropist. He served as the chairman and chief investment officer of Legg Mason Capital Management as well as the principal portfolio manager of the Legg Mason Capital Management Value Trust. He is the portfolio manager of the former Legg Mason Opportunity Trust mutual funds, now housed at his own firm Miller Value Partners.

Early life 

Bill Miller was born in 1950 in Laurinburg, North Carolina. His father worked as a terminal manager for a trucking company.

Miller graduated with honors from Washington and Lee University in 1972 with a degree in economics. He served in the U.S. Army from 1972 to 1975.  While serving in the military as a First Lieutenant, Miller received the Army Commendation Medal for meritorious service while assigned to the 502d U.S. Army Security Agency Company.  His rank upon leaving the U.S. Army was Captain.  Miller then pursued graduate studies in philosophy in the Ph.D. program at Johns Hopkins University while working part-time in accounting.

Career

J.E. Baker Company 
Prior to joining Legg Mason in 1981, he served as treasurer of the J.E. Baker Company, a major manufacturer of products for the steel and cement industries.

Legg Mason 
He joined Legg Mason Capital Management in 1981 as a security analyst. Miller received his CFA designation in 1986. In 2007, he was elected the chairman of the firm as well as its chief investment officer, running the Legg Mason Value Trust mutual fund. He turned over the Value Trust to Sam Peters in 2012, ending his relationship with Legg in 2016.

Other
Miller was an early investor in Amazon and invested heavily when most analysts were skeptical. He also invested heavily in Bitcoin and Valeant Pharmaceuticals.

Investment philosophy 
Miller is considered a value investor who believes that "any stock can be a value stock if it trades at a discount to its intrinsic value". Miller has reiterated his investment philosophy multiple times in letter to shareholders, writing this in his 2006 letter:Value investing means really asking what are the best values, and not assuming that because something looks expensive that it is, or assuming that because a stock is down in price and trades at low multiples that it is a bargain ... Sometimes growth is cheap and value expensive. . . . The question is not growth or value, but where is the best value ... We construct portfolios by using 'factor diversification.' . . . We own a mix of companies whose fundamental valuation factors differ. We have high P/E and low P/E, high price-to-book and low-price-to-book. Most investors tend to be relatively undiversified with respect to these valuation factors, with traditional value investors clustered in low valuations, and growth investors in high valuations ... It was in the mid-1990s that we began to create portfolios that had greater factor diversification, which became our strength ...We own low PE and we own high PE, but we own them for the same reason: we think they are mispriced. We differ from many value investors in being willing to analyze stocks that look expensive to see if they really are. Most, in fact, are, but some are not. To the extent we get that right, we will benefit shareholders and clients.

Efficient market hypothesis 
The Legg Mason Capital Management Value Trust's after-fee return beat the S&P 500 index for 15 consecutive years from 1991 through 2005 (consistently producing market-beating returns is considered to be very unlikely according to the efficient market hypothesis).

Miller once said, "As for the so-called streak, that's an accident of the calendar. If the year ended on different months it wouldn't be there and at some point the mathematics will hit us. We've been lucky. Well, maybe it's not 100% luck—maybe 95% luck." Michael Mauboussin, former chief investment strategist at Legg Mason Capital Management, looked at the historical data on the percent of equity mutual funds that beat the market during Value Trust's 15-year streak.  Because the number of equity mutual funds beating the market fell as low as 8% in one year and 13% in another, he estimated the probability of beating the market in the 15 years ending 2005 was 1 in 2.3 million.

However, Leonard Mlodinow, in The Drunkard's Walk, notes that Mauboussin's analysis misframes the question and, when framed properly, the probability of occurrence of such a streak is much higher, around 3%. Additionally, Mauboussin's analysis also doesn't consider other possible 15-year windows where similar streaks could have occurred, but did not. When these periods are also included in the analysis, the odds of someone beating the market 15 years in a row at some point in the United States is around 75%—in other words, it would have been unlikely if there hadn't been such an occurrence.

Personal life 
Miller lives in Orchid, Florida. In 2018, Miller made a $75 million donation to the philosophy department of his alma mater Johns Hopkins University, the largest-ever gift to a philosophy department. He stated that philosophy "ha[d] made a huge difference both to my life outside business...and to the actual decisions I've made in investing". In 2021, he donated $50 million to support Johns Hopkins's physics and astronomy department.

A character based on Miller was featured in the 2015 movie The Big Short about the financial crisis of 2007–2008. An arrogant fund manager named Bruce Miller and played by actor Tony Bentley debates Steve Carell's character at an investment conference, "blustering on about the fundamental strength of Bear Stearns stock".

In June 2022, Miller married fellow JHU Trustee Heather Miller.

References

External links
 Legg Mason Capital Management
 CNNMoney - Will the market kill Bill?
 CNNMoney - Bear Stearns investors: Who lost big
 Best Fund Managers 2006 - Bill Miller, BusinessWeek.com.
 Lowe, Janet. 2002. The Man Who Beats the S&P: Investing with Bill Miller. Wiley. .
 Kosowski, Robert, Allan Timmermann, Russ Wermers, and Hal White, 2006, "Can Mutual Fund 'Stars' Really Pick Stocks? New Evidence from a Bootstrap Analysis," Journal of Finance (Lead Article; Finalist, Smith Breeden Prize for the Outstanding Paper of December 2006 to October 2007 Published in The Journal of Finance), December, pages 2551-2595
 Barras, Laurent, Oliver Scaillet, and Russ Wermers. "False Discoveries in Mutual Fund Performance: Measuring Luck in Estimated Alphas." The Journal of Finance, Vol. LxV, No. 1, February 2010.
 Petajisto, Antti. "Active Share and Mutual Fund Performance." September 30, 2010.
 Bill Miller Latest Portfolio
 Mauboussin, Andrew and Samuel Arbesman. "Differentiating Skill and Luck in Financial Markets with Streaks." November 29, 2010.
 Bill Miller Dishes On His Streak and His Strategy

1950 births
Living people
American philanthropists
American money managers
CFA charterholders
Chief investment officers
Santa Fe Institute people
Johns Hopkins University alumni
Washington and Lee University alumni
Businesspeople from North Carolina
People from Laurinburg, North Carolina